This article lists the prominent members of the United States Army National Guard.

Colonial era

Israel Putnam
Robert Rogers
Myles Standish
John Stark
John Underhill
Seth Warner
George Washington

American Revolution

Ethan Allen
Patrick Henry
Paul Revere

War of 1812

James Buchanan
Samuel Ringgold
Samuel Smith
Stephen Van Rensselaer

1820s–1840s

Abraham Lincoln
Franklin Pierce
James Polk

American Civil War

Chester A. Arthur
Nathaniel B. Baker
Peter T. Washburn

Late 1800s

John Jacob Astor IV
Benjamin O. Davis Sr.
Christian Fleetwood
John F. Hartranft
Theodore Roosevelt

Early 1900s

Paul Bragg
William Frank
Frederick E. Humphreys
William Leushner
Cornelius Vanderbilt III
William Seward Webb

World War I

Carlton Brosius
Buster Keaton
James Naismith
John F. O'Ryan
Harry S. Truman

1920s

Hannes Kolehmainen
Charles Lindbergh
Babe Ruth

1930s

Curtis LeMay
Edward Martin
Jack Turnbull
John W. Vessey

World War II

Julius Ochs Adler
Robert S. Beightler
Kenneth F. Cramer
Irving Fish
Ernest W. Gibson Jr.
William S. Key
Norman Mailer
Raymond S. McLain
Butler B. Miltonberger
Milton Reckord
Leonard F. Wing
Rodger Wilton Young
Cornelius W. Wickersham

Late 1940s

Jimmy Bloodworth
Bob Crane

1950s

John O. Marsh
Audie Murphy
Wendell H. Ford
Curt Simmons

1960s

John Amos
Willie Davenport
Ken Holtzman
Peter T. King
Tom Selleck

1970s

Larry Craig
Gary Herbert
Sonny Montgomery
Butch Otter
Dan Quayle

1980s

Scott Perry
Michael C. Thompson
Tim Walz

1990s

Jill Bakken
Paul Babeu
James G. Blaney

2000s

Shauna Rohbock
Terry Schappert
Courtney Zablocki

2010s

Scott Brown
Tammy Duckworth
Tulsi Gabbard
Leigh Ann Hester
John Napier
Jill Stevens
Tim Kennedy (fighter)
Alexandra Curtis
Max Rose

References

United States Army National Guard